Solberg Lake is a lake in the U.S. state of Minnesota.

Solberg Lake was named for A. H. Solberg, a pioneer farmer who settled there.

See also
List of lakes in Minnesota

References

Lakes of Minnesota
Lakes of Douglas County, Minnesota
Lakes of Grant County, Minnesota